Michael Gerard Finn (born 1 May 1954) is an English former professional association footballer who played as a goalkeeper.

References
Burnley player stats at the Post-War Player Database

1954 births
Living people
English footballers
Association football goalkeepers
Burnley F.C. players
Accrington Stanley F.C. players
Accrington Stanley F.C. managers
English Football League players
Footballers from Liverpool
English football managers